The Cuejdiu is a left tributary of the river Bistrița in Romania. It discharges into the Bistrița in Piatra Neamț.

References

Rivers of Romania
Rivers of Neamț County